Elections to City of Lincoln Council in Lincolnshire, England, were held on 4 May 2006. One third of the Council was up for election and the Labour Party stayed in Overall control of the Council.

After the election, the composition of the council was:
Labour 25
Conservative 7
Liberal Democrat 1

Election result

|-
| colspan=2 style="text-align: right; margin-right: 1em" | Total
| style="text-align: right;" | 11
| colspan=5 |
| style="text-align: right;" | 17,633
| style="text-align: right;" |

All comparisons in vote share are to the corresponding 2002 election.

Ward results

Abbey

Birchwood

Boultham

Bracebridge

Carholme

Castle

Glebe

Hartsholme

Minster

Moorland

Park

By-elections between 2006 and 2008

References

2006 English local elections
2006
2000s in Lincolnshire